Bee County is a county located in the U.S. state of Texas. It is in South Texas and its county seat is Beeville.

As of the 2020 census, the population was 31,047. The Beeville, TX Micropolitan Statistical Area includes all of Bee County.

The county was founded December 8, 1857, and organized the next year. It is named for Barnard E. Bee, Sr., a secretary of state of the Republic of Texas.

History
On December 8, 1857, the Texas Legislature formed Bee County from sections of Refugio, Live Oak, San Patricio, Goliad and Karnes counties, naming it for Colonel Barnard Elliot Bee who served the Republic of Texas as Sam Houston's Secretary of War and Mirabeau B. Lamar's Secretary of State.

During the Anglo-American land speculation of the 1830s, the area's earliest settlers were mainly Irish immigrants, but by the late 1840s and early 1850s the rise of Jacksonian expansionism inspired Southern whites from the North and South Carolina, Louisiana and Mississippi to occupy and build settlements in the area.

As the constitution of the Republic of Texas no longer recognized the Catholic Church (or any church) as the state religion and slave-holding settlers came to dominate the area in the 1840s, small Methodist, Presbyterian and Baptist congregations began forming with sustained missionary support from these denominations. Research suggests that Baptists and Methodists comprised 65 percent of all Texas congregations by 1870.

Courthouse
The Bee County Courthouse was designed by the architect William Charles Stephenson, originally from Buffalo, New York. The original courthouse, completed in 1912, cost $72,000. He also sculpted the "Justice Is Blind" monument (In his own words, an "Enlightened Justice") that tops the courthouse; he intentionally chose the "unblindfolded" concept. The structure uses the Chicago window style of a glass pane flanked by two narrow ones. It is classical with the grand portico having Corinthian columns at the entry.

Stephenson also designed the Rialto Theater in Beeville, now used for special occasion, not the running of films, which is located close to the Joe Barnhart Library. He helped construct the death mask of U.S. President William McKinley, who was assassinated in Buffalo in 1901. Stephenson also designed the courthouse in McMullen County, Texas and many other buildings, grand homes, schools, churches, and commercial buildings in and around Beeville.

Geography
The Aransas River forms in Bee County, southwest of Beeville and north of Skidmore.

Major highways
  U.S. Highway 59
  Interstate 69W is currently under construction and will follow the current route of U.S. 59 in most places.
  U.S. Highway 181
  State Highway 72
  State Highway 202
  State Highway 359
  Farm to Market Road 673
  Farm to Market Road 799
  Farm to Market Road 833

Adjacent counties
 Karnes County  (north)
 Goliad County  (northeast)
 Refugio County  (east)
 San Patricio County  (southeast)
 Live Oak County  (west)

Demographics

As of the 2020 United States census, there were 31,047 people, 8,499 households, and 5,693 families residing in the county. As of the 2010 United States census, 31,861 people were living in the county; 78.8% were White, 8.1% Black or African American, 0.6% Asian, 0.5% Native American, 0.1% Pacific Islander, 9.7% of some other race, and 2.3% of two or more races. About 56.2% were Hispanic or Latino (of any race).

As of the census of 2000, there were 32,359 people, 9,061 households, and 6,578 families living in the county.  The population density was 37 people per square mile (14/km2).  There were 10,939 housing units at an average density of 12 per square mile (5/km2).  The racial makeup of the county was 67.85% White, 9.90% Black or African American, 0.42% Native American, 0.51% Asian, 0.03% Pacific Islander, 19.15% from other races, and 2.13% from two or more races.  53.93% of the population were Hispanic or Latino of any race.

Of the 9,061 households, 37.80% had children under the age of 18 living with them, 52.90% were married couples living together, 14.80% had a female householder with no husband present, and 27.40% were not families. About 23.70% of all households were made up of individuals, and 9.90% had someone living alone who was 65 years of age or older.  The average household size was 2.74 and the average family size was 3.25.

In the county, the population was distributed as 23.40% under the age of 18, 13.30% from 18 to 24, 35.40% from 25 to 44, 17.80% from 45 to 64, and 10.20% who were 65 years of age or older.  The median age was 32 years. For every 100 females, there were 148.40 males.  For every 100 females age 18 and over, there were 164.90 males.

The median income for a household in the county was $28,392, and for a family was $32,967. Males had a median income of $26,473 versus $20,666 for females. The per capita income for the county was $10,625.  About 19.70% of families and 24.00% of the population were below the poverty line, including 33.80% of those under age 18 and 18.30% of those age 65 or over.

Government and infrastructure
The Texas Department of Criminal Justice operates the Correctional Institutions Division Region IV Office on the grounds of Chase Field Naval Air Station in unincorporated Bee County. In addition, Garza East Unit and Garza West Unit, transfer facilities, are co-located on the grounds of the naval air station, and the McConnell Unit is also in an unincorporated area in Bee County. The Beeville Distribution Center is on the grounds of the air station.

Politics
Bee County is somewhat moderate in comparison to surrounding counties in its support of Republicans in presidential elections. In 2016, Donald Trump won less than 56% of the vote. As recently as 1996 it gave a majority of its votes to the Democratic candidate.

Education

These school districts serve Bee County:
 Beeville Independent School District
 Mathis Independent School District (partial)
 Pawnee Independent School District (partial, K-8)
 Pettus Independent School District (partial)
 Refugio Independent School District (partial)
 Skidmore-Tynan Independent School District (partial)
 Three Rivers Independent School District (partial)

Coastal Bend College (formerly Bee County College), a postsecondary institution, serves Bee County among other counties and areas.

Communities

City
 Beeville (county seat)

Census-designated places

 Blue Berry Hill
 Normanna
 Pawnee
 Pettus
 Skidmore
 Tuleta
 Tulsita
 Tynan

Unincorporated communities

 Blanconia
 Cadiz
 Caesar
 Clareville
 Mineral
 Monteola
 Oaks
 Olmos
 Orangedale
 Papalote
 Yougeen

See also

 List of museums in South Texas
 National Register of Historic Places listings in Bee County, Texas
 Recorded Texas Historic Landmarks in Bee County

References

External links
 Bee County government official website
 
 Historic Bee County materials, hosted by the Portal to Texas History
 Beeville History

 
1858 establishments in Texas
Populated places established in 1858